Woolsthorpe Manor in Woolsthorpe-by-Colsterworth, near Grantham, Lincolnshire, England, is the birthplace and was the family home of Sir Isaac Newton. He was born there on 25 December 1642 (old calendar). At that time, it was a yeoman's farmstead, principally rearing sheep.

Newton returned here in 1666 when Cambridge University closed due to the plague, and here, he performed many of his most famous experiments, most notably his work on light and optics. This is also said to be the site where Newton, observing an apple fall from a tree, was inspired to formulate his law of universal gravitation.

Now in the hands of the National Trust and open to the public all year round, it is presented as a typical seventeenth century yeoman's farmhouse (or as near to that as possible, taking into account modern living, health and safety requirements and structural changes that have been made to the house since Newton's time).

New areas of the house, once private, were opened up to the public in 2003, with the old rear steps (that once led up to the hay loft and grain store and often seen in drawings of the period) being rebuilt, and the old walled kitchen garden, to the rear of the house, being restored.

One of the former farmyard buildings has been equipped so that visitors can have hands-on experience of the physical principles investigated by Newton in the house.

It is a Grade I listed building.

The tree

Isaac Newton recounted to his contemporary William Stukeley how an apple tree in the orchard inspired him to work on his law of universal gravitation. Dendrochronology confirms one of the trees in the orchard to be over 400 years old, having regrown from roots surviving from a tree which blew down in 1820. It is attended by gardeners, secured with a fence, and cared for by National Trust for Places of Historic Interest or Natural Beauty.

The village
Woolsthorpe-by-Colsterworth (not to be confused with Woolsthorpe-by-Belvoir, also in Lincolnshire) has grown from a hamlet of several houses in the seventeenth century to a small village of several hundred houses today; much of the original land once owned by Woolsthorpe Manor was sold to a nearby family, and some of the immediate open land has since been built upon.  Woolsthorpe Manor remains on the edge of the village and is mostly surrounded by fields.

In popular culture 
 Appears in episode three and ten of the TV documentary Cosmos: A Spacetime Odyssey, whilst discussing the development of planetary motion and Newton's work on the matter.
Also appears in a BBC documentary, Isaac Newton: The Dark Heretic.

See also
Isaac Newton's early life and achievements

References

External links

Woolsthorpe Manor information at the National Trust

Country houses in Lincolnshire
Woolsthorpe
Grade I listed houses
Grade I listed museum buildings
Historic house museums in Lincolnshire
Isaac Newton
National Trust properties in Lincolnshire
Science museums in England
South Kesteven District
Birthplaces of individual people

de:Woolsthorpe-by-Colsterworth#Woolsthorpe Manor